NGC 146 is a small open cluster in the constellation Cassiopeia. It was discovered by John Herschel in 1829 using his father's 18.7 inch reflecting telescope.

Location 

NGC 146 is fairly easy to locate in the sky, being half a degree away from the bright star Kappa Cassiopeiae. However, spotting the cluster itself is difficult because of its low apparent magnitude of 9.1. Its relatively high declination of about 63° means it is not visible for below 27° S.
Its distance is estimated at about 3030 parsecs (9880 light years ), but may be around 3500 pc (11000 ly) away.

Characteristics 
The cluster is at most 10 million years old, as there are numerous B-type main sequence stars and pre-main-sequence stars but relatively few evolved supergiants. Among its most massive stars are two Herbig Be stars.

References

Further reading 
 

Open clusters
0146
Cassiopeia (constellation)